Venkataram Mysore is a dermatologist, dermatopathologist, and hair transplant surgeon from Bangalore, India. He has over 30 years experience as a dermatologist, 18 years as a teacher and is currently the director of the Venkat Center for Advanced Dermatology and Post-Graduate Training. 

He was the president of the Indian Association of Dermatologists, Venereologists, and Leprologists in 2015. He became president of the Dermatologists and Aesthetic Surgeons International League (DASIL) at a ceremony held at its seventh world congress held in Buenos Aires from 31 October – 3 November 2018. 

He also served as president of the Association of Cutaneous Surgeons of India (ACS(I)) from 2010-2013, and the Association of Hair Restoration Surgeons of India in 2013.

Education and Career
Dr. Mysore completed his MBBS in 1981, and MD in dermatology and venereology from the Government Medical College, Mysore affiliated with the University of Mysore. He was certified by the National Board of Examinations (DNB) in 1987. 

He was the first Indian dermatologist to receive a diploma from the Royal College of Pathologists, London in 1995.
Dr. Venkat served in the Indian Airforce from 1981-86. He then worked at Al Nahdha Hospital, Oman from 1990-1998, and Salmaniya Hospital, Bahrain from 1998-2003. He was on the teaching faculty in Sultan Qaboos University, Oman  and Arabian Gulf University, Bahrain during 1990-2003. He received training in Hair Transplantation from University of Daegu, South Korea under Professor Jung Chul Kim. 

On his return to India, he founded the Venkat Charmalaya - Centre for Advanced Dermatology and Post-graduate Training, which is now renamed the Venkat Center. It received accreditation from the Rajeev Gandhi University of Health Sciences in 2012 and is one of the very few centers in India to impart training in Aesthetic Dermatology.

Honours and awards
Dr. Venkat is an international mentor for the American Society of Dermatologic Surgery (ASDS) having delivered the Lawrence Fields Keynote address at their meeting in New Orleans in 2016. He is also a Fellow of the Royal College of Physicians (Glasgow), and an Honorary Fellow of the International Society of Hair Restoration Surgeons. He is the winner of V.N. Sehgal award for academic excellence in 2012, the Ganapathi Panja award for dermatopathology from Indian Association of Dermatologists, Venereologists, and Leprologists (IADVL) in 2018, and the ILDS appreciation award in 2014.

Dr. Mysore as an author and editor
Dr. Venkataram Mysore has authored numerous articles. He is the editor of some of Indian dermatologists' most read-books. He was the editor-in-chief of the  Journal of Cutaneous Surgeons, from 2009-2013, and the ACS(I) Textbook  of Cutaneous and Aesthetic Surgery from 2011 to date. He has written 90 articles, four books, and chapters in 17 books. He is also the author of a book on hair transplantation as well as dermatology.

Chief Editor

Hair Transplantation Jaypee Publications, New Delhi, 2016 

ACS (I) Textbook of Cutaneous and Aesthetic Surgery Jaypee Publications, New Delhi, 2012 
Selected Publications

Mysore V. "Body hair transplantation: Case report of successful outcome." Journal of Cutaneous and Aesthetic Surgery. 2013;6:113-6 

Mysore V. "Should advertising by aesthetic surgeons be permitted?." Journal of Cutaneous and Aesthetic Surgery. 2017;10:48 

Mahadevappa OH, Mysore V, Viswanath V, Thurakkal S, Majid I, Talwar S, Aurangabadkar SJ, Chatterjee M, Bhat RM, Barua S, Ganjoo A. "Surgical outcome in patients taking concomitant or recent intake of oral isotretinoin: A multicentric Study-ISO-AIMS study". Journal of Cutaneous and Aesthetic Surgery. 2016;9:106-12 

Mysore V, Shashikumar B M. "Guidelines on the use of finasteride in androgenetic alopecia." Indian J Dermatol Venereol Leprol 2016;82:128-34 

Mysore V, Shashikumar B M. "Targeted phototherapy." Indian J Dermatol Venereol Leprol 2016;82:1-6 

Venkataram J, Mysore V. "Liposuction and the cutaneous surgeon." J Cutan Aesthet Surgery 2013;6:129-31 

Majid I, Mysore V, Salim T, Lahiri K, Chatterji M, Khunger N, Talwar S, Sachhidanand S, Barua S. "Is lesional stability in vitiligo more important than disease stability for performing surgical interventions? results of a multicentric study." Journal of Cutaneous and Aesthetic Surgery. 2016;9:13-9 

Gupta M, Mysore V. "Classifications of patterned hair loss: a review." Journal of Cutaneous and Aesthetic Surgery. 2016;9:3-12 

Anitha B, Mysore V. "Lichen amyloidosis: Novel treatment with fractional ablative 2,940 nm Erbium: YAG laser treatment." Journal of Cutaneous and Aesthetic Surgery. 2012;5:141-3

Mysore V. "Invisible dermatoses." Indian Journal Dermatol Venereol Leprol 2010;76:239-48 

Patwardhan N, Mysore V. "Hair transplantation: Standard guidelines of care." Indian J Dermatol Venereol Leprol 2008;74, Suppl S1:46-53 

Mysore V. "Tumescent liposuction: Standard guidelines of care." Indian Journal Dermatol Venereol Leprol 2008;74, Suppl S1:54-60 

Mysore, Venkataram. "Hair Transplantation Surgery - Its Current Status." Journal of Cutaneous and Aesthetic Surgery 3.2 (2010): 67–68. PMC. Web. 23 Mar. 2018.

Mysore, Venkataram, and T Salim. "CELLULAR GRAFTS IN MANAGEMENT OF LEUCODERMA." Indian Journal of Dermatology 54.2 (2009): 142–149. PMC. Web. 23 Mar. 2018.

Jane Subodh D, Mysore, Venkataram. "Effectiveness of short-pulse width Nd:YAG in laser hair reduction." Journal of Cosmetic Dermatology, October 2018.

Omprakash H M., Khatri, Gayatri Nagindas, Mysore Venkataram. "Isotretinoin and dermatosurgical procedures." Indian Journal of Dermatologists Venereologists & Leprologists, July 2018.

Chathra Namitha, Mysore Venktaram. "Resurfacing of Facial Acne Scars With a New Variable-Pulsed Er:YAG Laser in Fitzpatrick Skin Types IV and V." Journal of Cutaneous and Aesthetic Surgery, January-March, 2018.

Mysore, Venkataram; Mahadevappa, Omprakash H.; Barua, Shyamanta; Majid, Imran; Viswanath, Vishalakshi; Bhat, Ramesh M.; Talwar, Suresh; Thurakkal, Salim; Aurangabadkar, Sanjeev J. "Standard Guidelines of Care: Performing Procedures in Patients on or Recently Administered with Isotretinoin". Journal of Cutaneous and Aesthetic Surgery, October-December, 2017

References

Related links
Dr. Venkat's Website
Dr. Venkat's Hair Transplant Website
Dr. Venkat's Dermatology Website

Living people
Indian dermatologists
1957 births
Medical doctors from Karnataka
Medical doctors from Bangalore
Indian plastic surgeons